Hymenopus is a genus of flower mantises belonging to the family Hymenopodidae. This genus is widespread in the tropical forests of East Asia.

Species
 Hymenopus bicornis Latreille, 1807 
 Hymenopus coronatoides Wang, Liu & Yin, 1994 
 Hymenopus coronatus (Olivier, 1792) - Malaysian orchid mantis

References

External links 
 
 Biolib

Hymenopodidae
Mantodea genera
Taxa named by Jean Guillaume Audinet-Serville